The Statehouse Convention Center is a convention center located in downtown Little Rock, Arkansas, U.S., containing approximately  of space.

A 650-space parking deck is located only one block south of the convention center.

See also
List of convention centers in the United States

References

External links
Homepage

Little Rock Trojans men's basketball
Indoor arenas in Arkansas
Sports venues in Arkansas
Convention centers in Arkansas
Buildings and structures in Little Rock, Arkansas
Tourist attractions in Little Rock, Arkansas
Basketball venues in Arkansas